Ferndale Airfield  is a public use airport in Flathead County, Montana, United States. It is owned by the Flathead Municipal Airport Authority and located three nautical miles (6 km) northeast of the central business district of Bigfork, Montana.

Facilities and aircraft 
Ferndale Airfield covers an area of 35 acres (14 ha) at an elevation of 3,072 feet (936 m) above mean sea level. It has one runway designated 15/33 with a turf surface measuring 3,500 by 95 feet (1,067 x 29 m).

For the 12-month period ending August 24, 2005, the airport had 10,700 aircraft operations, an average of 29 per day: 99% general aviation and 1% air taxi. At that time there were 36 aircraft based at this airport: 97% single-engine and 3% glider.

See also 
 List of airports in Montana

References

External links 
 Aerial image as of July 1990 from USGS The National Map
 

Airports in Montana
Transportation in Flathead County, Montana
Buildings and structures in Flathead County, Montana